The Needle Range is a mountain range in Nye County, Nevada.

References 

Mountain ranges of the Great Basin
Mountain ranges of Nevada
Mountain ranges of Nye County, Nevada